Harry Myatt ( – 9 October 1967) was a football manager, noted for being the manager of Port Vale.

Biography
Myatt was  an investor with Port Vale, he was one of a number of individuals who put money into the club in December 1908. He became a director and club vice-chairman, before being appointed team manager in October 1913, stepping down 7 months later.

He remained active in Port Vale, assisting the manager rebuild post-World War I and helping the club resist a merger with rivals Stoke City in 1926. He was elected as the club's first President in 1960.

References

Year of birth uncertain
1967 deaths
English football managers
Port Vale F.C. managers
Port Vale F.C. directors and chairmen
Port Vale F.C. non-playing staff
1880s births